Sunil Bardewa was a  Nepalese pop singer, songwriter, arranger and guitarist. He primarily did guitar works on all of his work therefore, his songs made him popular not only as a singer but as one of well recognized guitarists among local youths in the early 2000s. Bardewa died at the age of 44 on 13 September 2016.

Sunil Bardewa was initially involved in a musical band, The Matrix. In the band, he was joined by another Nepalese singer -Saroj Dutta. The band had won Sajan Smriti Pop Song Contest in 1995.

Two of the most popular songs of Sunil Bardewa are "Goreto Ani Ustai Cha Galli" and his pop ballad "Bihani Ma". Bardewa had written the lyrics of the song with Naresh Dev Pant.

References

Nepalese pop singers
Nepalese guitarists
Musicians from Kathmandu
1970s births
2016 deaths
Nepali-language singers